1996 Bellmare Hiratsuka season

Review and events

League results summary

League results by round

Competitions

Domestic results

J.League

Emperor's Cup

J.League Cup

International results

Asian Super Cup

Asian Cup Winners' Cup

Player statistics

 † player(s) joined the team after the opening of this season.

Transfers

In:

Out:

Transfers during the season

In
 Kenji Takeichi (from Bellmare Hiratsuka youth)
 Atsushi Hirano (from Bellmare Hiratsuka youth)
 Almir (on August)

Out

Awards

none

References

Other pages
 J.League official site
 Shonan Bellmare official website

Bellmare Hiratsuka
Shonan Bellmare seasons